Kevin Corlew (born August 19, 1971) is an American politician who served in the Missouri House of Representatives from the 14th district from 2015 to 2018.

Electoral history

State Representative

State Senate

References

1971 births
Living people
Republican Party members of the Missouri House of Representatives